Meyreuil is a commune in the Bouches-du-Rhône department in southern France, about  from Aix en Provence.

Geography
Located  from Aix-en-Provence, the commune of Meyreuil is sheltered in the northeast by the mountain Montagne Sainte-Victoire, and the district of Canet is separated from the chief town by the river Arc.

Meyreuil is composed of three principal districts:

Meyreuil village includes the town hall, the church and the cemetery. Nestled on the hillside, the old village is very peaceful.

The Plan of Meyreuil, where the majority of the trade, the post office or the media library are located, is the economic center of the commune.

Canet, situated on RN7 (the road between Paris and Nice) has always been a transportation hub. Formerly the location of two stagecoach stops, Canet today includes many hotels and restaurants, as well as a technology park .

History
The name of Meyreuil comes from that of the Roman General Marius, who fought a battle against the Ambrones and the Teutons near Aix in 102 B.C.

The village was successively called MIROIL (1098), MAIROL or MAIROIL in 1154, MEROLIO in 1259, MAREUIL to the 13th, 14th, 15th centuries, MAROLIUM and MEROLIUM in 1529, MERUEIL in 1634, MEIRUEILH in 1663, MEYRUEIL in 1766. The current name of MEYREUIL is at most 200 years old.

In the 15th century, it belonged to Guillaume de Littera (1371-1452).

La Belle du Canet
A memorable figure in the history of Canet, la Belle du Canet was Lucrèce de Forbin-Solliès, widow of Henri de Rascas, lord of Canet and first Consul of Aix. She became the mistress of the Duke Louis de Vendôme, himself a widower. His deceased wife was Laure Mancini, niece of the  Jules Cardinal Mazarin. Louis XIV, under pretext that they were both widowed (and, undoubtedly, for other more political reasons), opposed their marriage and had the Duke named as a Cardinal. This did not prevent the two lovers from being together. The Duke of Vendôme who lived in Aix-en-Provence at Cours Mirabeau, had a country house built, the Pavillon Vendôme, to meet his beloved who took care to disguise herself. The peasants of the suburb where the house was built called these disguised people the "machouettos".  It is there that the Duke died Tuesday August 6, 1669, at only 57 years of age.

Population

Administration

Laurent Chazal, the mayor of the commune for 34 years, died on May 29, 2005. Robert Lagier succeeded Chazal as a result of the elections of July 3 and July 10, 2005. In March 2020, Jean-Pascal Gournes was elected mayor.

See also
 Palette AOC
Communes of the Bouches-du-Rhône department

References

External links
Meyreuil Provence Web
Meyreuil
Meyreuil official town website
Pavillon Vendome

Communes of Bouches-du-Rhône
Bouches-du-Rhône communes articles needing translation from French Wikipedia